The women's 1500 metres at the 1988 Summer Olympics in Seoul, South Korea had an entry list of 28 competitors, with two qualifying heats (28) before the final (12) took place on Saturday October 1, 1988.

From the gun in the final, Paula Ivan wanted the lead.  Mary Slaney and Ivan's teammate Doina Melinte didn't want to let her get away.  The field behind her looked bunched but the 1:02.52 first lap showed she was serious.  This was world record pace, rare for a championship race that usually breaks down into a strategic battle.  After the first lap, a small gap began to open.  Melinte was the last to maintain contact, perhaps having seen this strategy previously in domestic competition.  The second lap was completed in 1:03.26, a ten-metre gap had opened, with Tetyana Samolenko edging past Melinte in chase.  2:52.66 at the bell and a fifteen-metre gap, Ivan began a last lap kick, trying to run the 60 second last lap to get the world record.  Because of the acceleration, the third lap was the fastest of them all at 1:02.46.  The battle was for the medals behind Ivan, Andrea Hahmann passing Samolenko, who had Christina Cahill on her shoulder with Lynn Williams in chase.  Melinte faded back to Slaney but behind all of them, Laimutė Baikauskaitė was charging.  Onto the home stretch the chase pack was tightening, some 30 metres behind Ivan.  Baikauskaitė moved into lane 3 to find some running room.  Ivan wasn't able to find a 60-second lap, 61.5 was enough to set the Olympic record out of sight with a dominant gold medal performance.  Hahmann faded and Samolenko was leading down the stretch with Cahill in close pursuit.  Making up ten metres on the final straight, Baikauskaitė passed Cahill and Hahmann in the final 15 metres and leaned past Samolenko at the line to take the silver.

Medalists

Records
These were the standing world and Olympic records (in minutes) prior to the 1988 Summer Olympics.

The following Olympic record (in minutes) was set during this competition.

Final

Non-Qualifiers

See also
 1987 Women's World Championships 1500 metres (Rome)
 1990 Women's European Championships 1500 metres (Split)
 1991 Women's World Championships 1500 metres (Tokyo)
 1992 Women's Olympic 1500 metres (Barcelona)

References

External links
  Official Report

 1
1500 metres at the Olympics
1988 in women's athletics
Women's events at the 1988 Summer Olympics